Richard Bremmer (born 27 January 1953) is an English actor.

Early life
Bremmer was born and brought up in Warwickshire.

Career
Bremmer first began his career in the short film of Couples and Robbers before being in his first full-length film The Girl with Brains in Her Feet. He was the first to portray the character Lord Voldemort in Harry Potter and the Philosopher's Stone (with the footage he appears in being reused in Harry Potter and the Deathly Hallows – Part 2), in a flashback sequence where the famous villain arrived at the home of the titular character's parents to kill them, though Bremmer's face is never seen (later in the film, the character is CGI and voiced by Ian Hart, the actor who played Quirrell in the same film). He was cast as Skeld in The 13th Warrior and also appeared in the 2004 film Viper in the Fist, an adaptation of the novel of the same name by Hervé Bazin.

Bremmer's stage credits include A Midsummer Night's Dream, Julius Caesar, Rosencrantz and Guildenstern Are Dead, King Lear and MacBeth. He has appeared in movies such as the 2014 biographical drama Mr. Turner, the 2015 adventure-drama In the Heart of the Sea, the 2007 biographical drama Control, the 2003 action comedy Shanghai Knights and the 2001 comedy film Just Visiting. His television credits include the fantasy drama series Beowulf: Return to the Shieldlands, the historical drama series The Borgias, the adventure-drama series Crusoe, and the docudrama Dunkirk.

Filmography

Film

Television

References

External links

1953 births
English male film actors
English male television actors
English male voice actors
Living people
People from Warwickshire
20th-century English male actors
21st-century English male actors